Miss America 1960, the 33rd Miss America pageant, was held at the Boardwalk Hall in Atlantic City, New Jersey on September 12, 1959 on CBS.

Pageant winner Lynda Lee Mead was the second Miss Mississippi in a row to wear the crown, succeeding actress Mary Ann Mobley.

Among the other contestants was Ann Marston of Michigan, an archery champion who had appeared on the cover of the Aug. 8, 1955 edition of Sports Illustrated. Her skill with a bow and arrow won Marston the talent portion of the 1960 pageant.

Dawn Wells, later to star on the television series Gilligan's Island, represented Nevada in the Miss America 1960 competition.

Results

Order of announcements

Top 10

Top 5

Awards

Preliminary awards

Other awards

Contestants

External links
 Miss America official website

1960
1959 in the United States
1960 beauty pageants
1959 in New Jersey
September 1959 events in the United States
Events in Atlantic City, New Jersey